Zarrella is a surname. Notable people with the surname include:

Dale Zarrella, Hawaiian sculptor and painter
Giovanni Zarrella (born 1978), German-Italian singer and television presenter
Jana Ina Zarrella (born 1976), Brazilian television personality and presenter
John Zarrella, American news correspondent